The 1944–45 Illinois Fighting Illini men's basketball team represented the University of Illinois.

Regular season
After the second worst season in Doug Mills tenure as the head coach of the Fighting Illini, the ongoing war created even more havoc with the 1944–45 season.  The Illini were required to play games close to home which meant they played certain teams multiple times.  For example, the team played Great Lakes three times, Chanute Field, in nearby Rantoul, Illinois, two times and George Mikan and the DePaul Blue Demons two times as well.  As the season progressed, Mills experimented with several lineups, including a 19 player barrage versus Nebraska.  These varied lineups allowed Mills to play an impressive freshman, Johnny Orr, playing his only season for Illinois prior to rejoining his high school coach, Dolph Stanley, at Beloit College in Beloit, Wisconsin.

The Big Ten Conference season was unusual as well.  The Illini dropped their opening game to Michigan followed by a seven-game winning streak then concluding with four consecutive losses.  The heaviest load fell on the hands of sophomores Walt Kirk and Howard Judson with freshman Walt Kersulis, Jack Burmaster, and Orr also being major contributors. Kirk would be named a Consensus All-American for his performance during the season.

The team completed their season with an overall record of 13 wins and 7 losses with a conference mark of 7 and 5 for a third-place finish. They finished with a 7 - 3 record at home and a road record of 5 - 4.  The starting lineup consisted of Walton Kirk, Howard Judson, Johnny Orr, Jack Burmaster, Don Delaney and Walt Kersulis.

Roster

Source

Schedule

|-
!colspan=12 style="background:#DF4E38; color:white;"| Non-Conference regular season

|- align="center" bgcolor=""

|-
!colspan=9 style="background:#DF4E38; color:#FFFFFF;"|Big Ten regular season

Bold Italic connotes conference game
												
Source

Player stats

Awards and honors
Johnny Orr
Big Ten Coach of the Year (1974) Michigan
National Coach of the Year (1976) Michigan
Walt Kirk
Consensus First-Team All-American (1945)
Helms First-Team All-American (1945)
Argosy Magazine Second-Team All-American (1945)
Converse Honorable Mention All-American (1945)
Team Most Valuable Player

References

Illinois Fighting Illini
Illinois Fighting Illini men's basketball seasons
1944 in sports in Illinois
1945 in sports in Illinois